Alessandro Gelsomino is an Italian rally driver. He was the co-driver to Ken Block.

He is married to Rhianon Gelsomino.

References

Italian rally co-drivers
1973 births
Living people